The Wereldmuseum Rotterdam (formerly known as the Museum voor Land- en Volkenkunde) is an ethnographic museum, situated at Willemskade in Rotterdam, the Netherlands.

The museum was founded in 1883 and shows more than 1800 ethnographic objects from various cultures in Asia, Oceania, Africa, the Americas and the Islamic heritage.

See also 

 Nationaal Museum van Wereldculturen

References

External links

 Wereldmuseum, official website

1883 establishments in the Netherlands
Art museums and galleries in the Netherlands
Ethnographic museums in the Netherlands
Museums established in 1883
Museums in Rotterdam
Rijksmonuments in Rotterdam
Asian art museums in the Netherlands
19th-century architecture in the Netherlands